Les Granettes is a hamlet close to Aix-en-Provence in France.

Overview
There is a primary school. The hamlet is also home to a vineyard, Château La Bougerelle.

In 2011, residents complained about new constructions, including a roundabout, a carpark and block of flats, to the detriment of an old farm and century-old Mediterranean Cypress trees.

Notable residents
François Marius Granet.
Alexander Calder in 1953. 
In 1954, Sam Francis rented the Mas des Roches with philosopher Rachel Jacobs and invited David Gascoyne.

References

Villages in Provence-Alpes-Côte d'Azur
Aix-en-Provence